Flying Legend SRL is an Italian aircraft manufacturer based in Caltagirone. The company specializes in the design and manufacture of replicas of historical aircraft.

The company is a collaborative project between MGA and Barum. The company is organized as a Società a responsabilità limitata (Srl), an Italian limited liability company.

Aircraft

See also

List of Italian companies

References

External links

Aircraft manufacturers of Italy
Manufacturing companies established in 2011
2011 establishments in Italy
Italian companies established in 2011